Nematocentropus schmidi is a species of moth belonging to the family Neopseustidae. It was described by Akira Mutuura in 1971. It is known only from the type-locality located southwest of the town of Rupa near the border of Bhutan in Assam, India.

The wingspan is about 16 mm. The specimen was found near a mountain stream on a heavily forested site at an elevation of approximately 2,154 meters.

References

Neopseustidae